= Sergei Rozin =

Russian ice hockey player (born 1977)

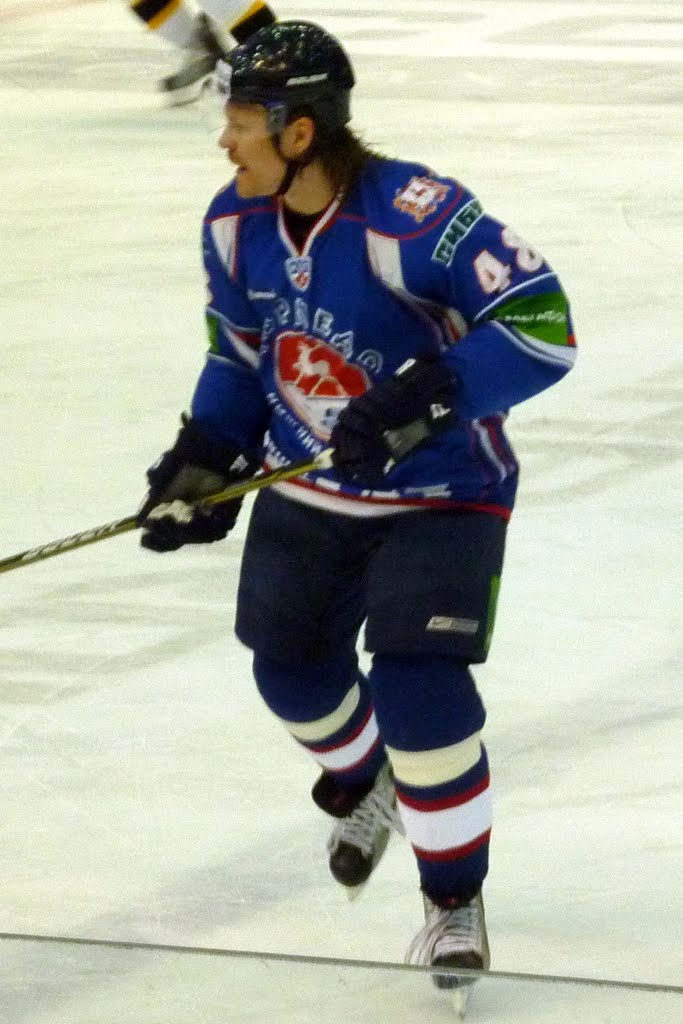
- December 2010
- Born: 13 June 1977 (age 49) St. Petersburg, Russia
- Height: 6 ft 0 in (183 cm)
- Weight: 192 lb (87 kg; 13 st 10 lb)
- Position: Defence
- Shoots: Right
- KHL team: Torpedo Nizhny Novgorod
- NHL draft: Undrafted
- Playing career: 1998–present

Sergei Rozin (born 13 June 1977) is a professional ice hockey player who is currently playing for Torpedo Nizhny Novgorod in the Kontinental Hockey League (KHL).
